A respiratory driven protocol is an algorithmic medical process applied by respiratory practitioners as an extension of the physician.  Respiratory-driven protocols are implemented in hospitals for treatment of people suffering from asthma, bronchiolitis, and other respiratory illness.  Respiratory-driven protocols are most widely applied in intensive-care units.  Respiratory practitioners are not utilized globally, so most application of respiratory practitioners as physician-extenders in this fashion is in the United States.

Cost-reduction 
Respiratory practitioners applying respiratory-driven protocols was initially designed and has been since shown to reduce patient cost and improve overall patient outcomes.

Benefits 
Respiratory-driven protocols have been shown to decrease hospital stays and improve overall outcomes in pediatric populations requiring respiratory intervention such as mechanical ventilation.

References 

Pulmonology